Raid on Entebbe is a 1977 NBC television film directed by Irvin Kershner. It is based on an actual event: Operation Entebbe and the freeing of hostages at Entebbe Airport in Entebbe, Uganda, on July 4, 1976. The portrayal of Prime Minister Yitzhak Rabin was Peter Finch's final performance; he died five days after the film's release.

Raid on Entebbe describes the rescue of the hostages held in Uganda, the discussions within the Israeli government, and the controversy prompted by the rescue. A similar production on the Entebbe raid, Victory at Entebbe, was rushed through production by ABC and broadcast one month earlier in December 1976.

Plot
On 27 June 1976, four terrorists belonging to a splinter group of the Popular Front for the Liberation of Palestine under the orders of Wadie Haddad boarded and hijacked an Air France Airbus A300 at Athens. With President Idi Amin's blessing, the terrorists divert the airliner and its hostages to Entebbe Airport in Uganda. After identifying Israeli passengers, the non-Jewish passengers are freed while a series of demands are made, including the release of 40 Palestinian militants held in Israel, in exchange for the hostages.

The Cabinet of Israel, led by Prime Minister Yitzhak Rabin, unwilling to give in to terrorist demands, is faced with difficult decisions as their deliberations lead to a top-secret military raid. The difficult and daring commando operation, "Operation Thunderbolt", will be carried out over 2,500 miles (4 000 km) from home and will take place on the Jewish Sabbath.

While still negotiating with the terrorists, who now numbered seven individuals including Palestinians and two Germans, the Israeli military prepared two Lockheed C-130 Hercules transports for the raid. The transports refueled in Kenya before landing at Entebbe Airport under the cover of darkness. The commandos led by Brig. Gen Dan Shomron had to contend with a large armed Ugandan military detachment and used a ruse to overcome the defenses. A black Mercedes limousine had been carried on board and was used to fool sentries that it was the official car that President Amin used on an impromptu visit to the airport.

Nearly complete surprise was achieved but a firefight resulted, ending with all seven terrorists and 45 Ugandan soldiers killed. The hostages were gathered together and most were quickly put on the idling C-130 aircraft. During the raid, one commando (the breach unit commander Yonatan Netanyahu, brother of future Prime Minister Benjamin Netanyahu), and three of the hostages, died. A fourth hostage, Dora Bloch, who had been taken to Mulago Hospital in Kampala, was murdered by the Ugandans on Idi Amin's orders.

With 102 hostages aboard and on their way to freedom, a group of Israeli commandos remained behind to destroy the Ugandan Air Force MiG-17 and MiG-21 fighters to prevent a retaliation. All the survivors of the attack force then joined in flying back to Israel via Nairobi and Sharm El Sheikh.

Cast

 Peter Finch as Yitzhak Rabin
 Charles Bronson as Brigadier General Dan Shomron
 Yaphet Kotto as Idi Amin
 Martin Balsam as Daniel Cooper
 Horst Buchholz as Wilfried Böse
 John Saxon as Major General Benny Peled
 Jack Warden as Lieutenant General Mordechai Gur
 Meshach Richards as Major General Allon
 Sylvia Sidney as Dora Bloch
 Robert Loggia as Yigal Allon
 Tige Andrews as Shimon Peres
 Eddie Constantine as Captain Michel Bacos
 David Opatoshu as Menachem Begin
 Allan Arbus as Eli Melnick
 Stephen Macht as Lieutenant Colonel Yonatan "Yoni" Netanyahu
 James Woods as Captain Sammy Berg
 Harvey Lembeck as Mr. Harvey
 Dinah Manoff as Rachel Sager
 Kim Richards as Alice
 Aharon Ipalé as Major David Grut
 Mariclare Costello as Gabrielle Krieger

Production
Raid on Entebbe was filmed entirely in the United States, with the Stockton Metropolitan Airport in Stockton, California, serving as both Entebbe Airport and an Israeli Air Force (IAF) base. Producers Blatt and Scherick turned to the "Hollywood Squadron", the 146th Airlift Wing of the California Air National Guard to provide three C-130 Hercules transports.
Scenes were also shot at the Van Nuys Military airport, Los Angeles; these included footage of passenger jets, and the interior of a C-130 in which Bronson made his speech to the team about to attack Entebbe.

The C-130E variant used by the Israeli Air Force was the same variant that was flown by the 146th Wing. The camouflage scheme used by both the United States Air Force and IAF was virtually identical, and with the overpainting of Israeli markings, the Hercules transports became both "set dressing" for an Israeli airfield and as the aircraft used in the raid on Entebbe. The 146th Airlift Wing also supplied all the military equipment, such as M151 jeeps and weapons that would be seen at an active base.

Other aircraft used in Raid on Entebbe include an Airbus A300B2 F-BVGA (seen in archive footage); a Boeing 707, two Douglas DC-8-31s, 10 North American F-86 Sabre (1/2 scale models representing the Ugandan Air Force MiGs), North American FJ-3 Fury and Bell UH-1 Iroquois helicopter.

Principal photography on Raid on Entebbe took place in November 1976, with the training for the raid that took place using a replica of the Entebbe Airport. The actual airport had been built by an Israeli construction company and their involvement led to an accurate mockup being built to test out tactics devised for the raid.

Reception

Critical response
Raid on Entebbe received initially good reviews. Capitalizing on its strong  all-star ensemble cast, a film version was released theatrically in the UK and Europe in early 1977.

In May 1977, local Thai authorities banned the film from being shown in Thailand. They argued it presented a one-sided image of the Middle East conflict and posed a risk to the nation's relations with Arab states.

Accolades

See also
 Operation Thunderbolt
 Victory at Entebbe
 7 Days in Entebbe

References

Notes

Citations

Bibliography

 Barron, Colin N. Planes on Film: Ten Favourite Aviation Films. Stirling, UK: Extremis Publishing, 2016. .
 Solomon, Aubrey. Twentieth Century Fox: A Corporate and Financial History. Lanham, Maryland: Scarecrow Press, 1989. .

External links
 
 
 

1977 television films
1977 films
1970s action thriller films
American aviation films
American political thriller films
American action thriller films
Cultural depictions of Idi Amin
Cultural depictions of Menachem Begin
American docudrama films
Films about the Israel Defense Forces
Films about aircraft hijackings
Films about terrorism in Africa
Films directed by Irvin Kershner
Films scored by David Shire
Films set in 1976
Films set in Israel
Films set in Uganda
Films set in airports
Films set on airplanes
Films shot in the United States
Operation Entebbe
Super Bowl lead-out shows
20th Century Fox Television films
Thriller films based on actual events
Films about battles and military operations
American drama television films
1970s English-language films
1970s American films